Wallace Walter "Cy" Warmoth (February 2, 1893 – June 20, 1957) was a Major League Baseball pitcher. He pitched parts of three seasons in the majors.

Sources

Major League Baseball pitchers
St. Louis Cardinals players
Washington Senators (1901–1960) players
Fort Wayne Chiefs players
Evansville Evas players
Nashville Vols players
Little Rock Travelers players
Memphis Chickasaws players
Atlanta Crackers players
Kansas City Blues (baseball) players
New Orleans Pelicans (baseball) players
Omaha Packers players
Baseball players from Illinois
1893 births
1957 deaths